Winona is a feminine given name, an Anglicized form of the Dakota descriptive term, Winúŋna, meaning "firstborn daughter."

People 
 Winona LaDuke (born 1959), Native American activist
 Winona Oak (born 1994), Swedish singer-songwriter
 Winona Ryder (born 1971), American actress
 Wynona Carr (1924–76), African-American gospel, R&B and rock and roll singer-songwriter
 Wynona Lipman (c. 1932–99), American politician and New Jersey state senator
 Wynonna Judd (born 1964), American country singer

Fictional characters 
 Wenonah, the mother of Hiawatha in Longfellow's epic poem The Song of Hiawatha (1855)
 Winona, legendary Dakota figure who committed suicide
 Winona, a character in the Pokémon universe
 Winona Kirk, the mother of Star Treks James T. Kirk
 Winona, in the Sebastian Barry novel Days Without End: adopted daughter of John Cole, one of the two main protagonists
 Winona, Applejack’s dog in My Little Pony: Friendship is Magic
 Wynonna, main character (portrayed by Melanie Scrofano) in the show Wynonna Earp
 Winona Pickford, a supporting character of Tales of Phantasia, one of the four heroes that defeated the game's main antagonist 100 years prior of the starting timeline
 Winona, a character in the British children's television series Rubbadubbers

References 

Lakota words and phrases